Poetry in Motion is a 1982 Canadian documentary film directed by Ron Mann featuring contemporary North American poetry and music. Featured are some of the Black Mountain poets, Beats, minimalist poets, and avant-garde poets. It was released in theaters, later being distributed on VHS, LaserDisc, and DVD. An extended CD-ROM version was also released.

Production
Poetry in Motion is Mann's second feature film after Imagine the Sound. While watching John Giorno and William S. Burroughs at a rock club, Mann discovered Giorno's Dial-A-Poem recordings during a break in the performance. The director later decided to create an anthology of "post-Beat" poets for a film. His idea was based on the poem anthology publication The New American Poetry 1945–1960 by Donald Allen. The first poet to say that they were interested in being in the film was Allen Ginsberg. Almost 40 poets performed more than 75 poems, and filmmaker Emile de Antonio helped cut down the filmed material to 90 minutes long. The film is interspersed with parts of an interview with Charles Bukowski. Performers include Allen Ginsberg, Kenward Elmslie, and Anne Waldman. A CD-ROM version was released with poems which were never in the film. All 47 hours of footage are held at the Art Gallery of Ontario.

Release
The film was originally released in theaters. It was later released on VHS, LaserDisc, and DVD. It was released on VHS in 1986 and on DVD in 2002.

Reception 
A review in the book Of-Hollywood Movies says, "If you aren't a student of contemporary poetry, Poetry in Motion serves as an excellent introduction. If you are, it's orgasmic". The film has been criticized for including only four Canadian poets, but proponents stated that "the film is a new genre that elides criticism based in nationalism".

References

External links
 

1982 films
Documentary films about poets
English-language Canadian films
Films directed by Ron Mann
Canadian documentary films
1982 documentary films
1980s English-language films
1980s Canadian films